Shaun Michael Fagan (born 22 March 1984 in Bellshill) is a Scottish footballer who plays for St. Roch's in the Scottish Junior Football Association, West Region. He has previously played in the Scottish Premier League for Motherwell.

Career
Fagan started his career with Motherwell, and made 84 appearances for them. He had a short loan stint at Stenhousemuir between December and January 2007. He was released by Motherwell at the end of the season, and joined Irish club Galway United in July 2007, where he made 9 appearances.

Fagan moved back to Scotland in January 2008, and signed for Clyde. He scored a goal in his Clyde debut, a penalty in a 3–1 defeat by Stirling Albion on 2 February 2008. He only made two more appearances for Clyde, and was released in May 2008. He signed for East Fife in September 2008.

He joined Stirling Albion for a second spell in June 2011 making his second club debut on 23 July in a 3–1 victory over Deveronvale in a Scottish Challenge Cup first round match.

Fagan worked as an assistant to Stirling manager Greig McDonald. He temporarily took charge of the team for their 1–0 victory against Rangers in October 2012, as McDonald was being married that day. He parted ways with the club the following month.

Fagan joined Junior side St. Roch's as a player in August 2013.

See also
Clyde F.C. season 2007-08

References

External links

Living people
1984 births
Footballers from Bellshill
Scottish footballers
Scottish Premier League players
Motherwell F.C. players
Stenhousemuir F.C. players
Galway United F.C. (1937–2011) players
League of Ireland players
Clyde F.C. players
Scottish Football League players
Scottish Junior Football Association players
Scotland under-21 international footballers
East Fife F.C. players
Stirling Albion F.C. players
St Roch's F.C. players
Association football midfielders